SD Gundam Force Emaki Musharetsuden Bukabuka Hen is a sequel to the SD Gundam Mushamaruden series. Like its predecessor, the manga was released alongside a promotional series of gunpla making it the first SD Gundam manga to be specifically overseen by Sunrise. The series also has a single volume prequel that was released later titled SD Gundam Force Emaki Musharetsuden Zero. 
The Comic BomBom stories were published in 18 chapters on 3 volumes, with each volume containing 6 chapters.

Plot
The actual story is a revival of the very first Musha Gundam storyline focusing on Ark's "Seven of Light" defenders, seven brave Musha Gundams who defend the land of Ark by order of the Shogundam. This basic story was presented in Musha Retsuden Zero, whilst Musha Retsuden was set a few years later. Just about all of the legendary defenders have fathered sons and are training them to one day assume their father's roles.

After the war against Yamikoutei (闇皇帝), Ark is ruled by evil forces. Descendants of the Seven of Light defenders scattered across the land, in search of the Bukabuka (武化舞可) armour that can bring peace to the world.  One day, when Retsumaru's family was threatened, a sword from the armour set appeared in front of Retsumaru, and so the story began...

Volume 1- Years ago, the forces of good and evil met in a climactic battle. Now, Ark is ruled by various tyrannical warriors. Retsumaru, son of the legendary hero Rekka Musha Gundam, sets out to form a new band of heroes and restore Ark's former glory.
Volume 2- Uniting with their fathers, the new generation of defenders prepare to strike the final blow against the demonic warlord Capiturn.
Volume 3- With the defeat of Capiturn, the young defenders have gone their separate ways. However, Retsumaru soon becomes aware of an even greater danger. Matured by his adventures, Retsumaru must launch a covert mission into the heart of enemy territory.

This form of the storyline was backed up by a model kit line which featured all of the fathers and sons, as well as their Mobile Musha secret weapon. Each of the kits had elements of interchangeable armour, with a story point being that one certain combination gave the central father and son pair a Dai-Shogun form. This form itself was released as the final kit of the line, based on how it appeared in Gundam Evolve 14.

The instructions for the model kits also presented a full colour manga side story. This sidestory, despite using elements from the main manga, appears to conflict with it, most notably in the portrayal of characters. The sidestory was primarily used to show the gimmicks of the kits (such as armour changing) in action in a story setting. Additionally, some of the kits had brief 4-panel humour comics on the bottom of their boxes. These comics made reference to events happening in the main manga story.

Characters

Team Rekka (烈火隊) 

 Shōnen-Musha Retsumaru (少年武者 烈丸) - Son of the legendary Rekka-Musha Gundam with very bushy eyebrows. After the family had been exiled, Retsumaru has been trained by his mother with a heavy wooden bat, seeing weapons were banned.  Upon facing his first real threat, the large Bukabuka No Goutou (號刀) sword was crafted from flames in his hand and with it a magical living phoenix scabbard. Somewhat cocky and arrogant, Retsumaru becomes leader of a new generation of defenders. After the successful defeat of Capiturn, Retsumaru becomes aware of a greater villain who abducts his teammates which leaves him to rescue them.  During this period he becomes a big brother/father figure to the mysterious child Saizo.  He is also a fan of baseball.
 Character based:  Impulse Gundam, Strike Freedom Gundam (Combined Buka Buka Weapon system), Sword Impulse Gundam (Repair Retsu Maru),  Destiny Gundam (Moda shou Retsu maru). 
 Goutou (號刀) - The sentient sheath of Retsumaru's sword, he gives advice to the young Musha during the adventure, but is also used for other purposes.  The sword also includes a knife (炎の小刀(ほむらのしょうとう)) on the sheath, designed for the wielder who has yet to achieve the power to unsheathe the sword. While Retsu is not able to unsheathe the Goutou for a long time, he does find other ways and means to use it, such as the Karamitsuki Mode and making the scabbard spit flames at enemies.

 Jimusuke (自無助) - Retsumaru's best friend and squire, he joins his friend on his travels.  As a running gag, he is often shown to be as ineffective as the GM mobile suits he is based on.  However, he eventually proves his worth when he is able to bring the various children together to lend their power to Retsumaru. He attempted to later join Retsumaru on his covert mission into Barzam Shogun's fortress but was refused, reuniting with his friend when the mission was over.
 Character based: GM Quel.
Shōnen-Kenshi Ranmaru (少年剣士 嵐丸) - Son of Zeta. A pretty boy, Ranmaru initially meets Retsumaru whilst under the employ of Ebirhu. When Ebirhu orders him to murder innocent civilians, Ranmaru realises his mistake and joins up with Retsumaru and Jimusuke. Despite the legendary teamwork of their fathers, the two boys often engage in rivalry. Ranmaru is the guardian of the Bukabuka No Hatou (覇兜) helmet, which grants him the power of flight.
 Character Based: Gundam TR -1 Hazel Custom.
Shōnen-Hoshi Kirimaru (少年法師 霧丸) - Adopted son of Nu. He greatly respects his somewhat over-protective father and struggles to live up to his legacy. When he is extremely angered, however, he is possessed by a dragon spirit which goes ballistic on everything in sight (This happens once only). Kirimaru is plagued by self-doubt, often relying on Retsumaru to build up his confidence. He wields the Bukabuka No Tenyoku fan, which splits into powerful Fin Funnels to attack. Ironically, Kirimaru and Nu are probably the pair which have one of the most demonstrative father-son relationships.
 Character Based: Xi Gundam, Hi Nu Gundam (With Funnel) . 
Younen-Gunshi Ikazuchimaru (幼年軍師 雷丸) - Son of Double Zeta. Although only roughly toddler age, his father has built him a powerful set of armour which can combine with his motorized tricycle in various ways and even combine with the armour of his father. Ikazuchimaru uses his youth to mislead enemies into a false sense of security. He is one of the first to realise Jimusuke's hidden potential and pressures him to show it, and does not reveal his identity as a powerful strategist until the final battle.
 Character based: Deep strikers.
Shōnen-Ninja Kakuremaru (少年忍者 隠丸) - Trained in the ninja arts like his father, he often uses these abilities to play tricks on others. He is the guardian of the Bukabuka No Shunkyaku, gigantic shoes which enable him to crush most enemies. His hiding techniques are very basic and obvious, but seem to work against enemies. For most of the series he referred to his Bukabuka-armed form as the "Ally of Justice Veiled in Mystery" and refused to acknowledge that it was he under the disguise.
 Character based: Gaplant TR -5 [ Hrairoo ] (Masked mode), Perfect Gundam III (Unmasked). 
Susamaru (鬼面武者 凄丸) - Son of Gyakubatsu and wielder of the Bukabuka No Tekken, gigantic arm extensions. Gyakubatsu and his son are from a line of musha that also possess 'the blood of ogres'. To combat this, Gyakubatsu left his family very early and left his son an ogre-mask to rein in his aggressive nature. The measures did not work and Susamaru was taken over by the ogre-mask, becoming a single-minded machine of destruction, bent only on collecting all the Bukabuka and defeating his father. Susamaru is only able to see the truth and forgive his father after he has died.
 Character based: Crossbone Gundam X1 kai. 
Saizo/Blank Form 0 (斎造/素体０) - A robot resembling a young Musha, it is perhaps the most lifelike of Mk II Titan's creations and is required to control the Tekki Musha Psyco Mk-II. Whilst being secretly transported, the convoy delivering it is attacked by Retsumaru. As Retsumaru is the first thing it sees, Saizo imprints on Retsumaru as father.  Saizo can transform into weapons for use by Retsumaru, and is able to summon ancient war machines with a flute. The war machines later become part of Psyco Mk II's body.
In Comic World version, Saizo was a product of Psyco (斎胡) and Crystal Phoenix (結晶鳳凰), raised by Noomaru.
 Character based: Gundam TR - 6 [ Wound Wort],  Gundam TR -6 Hyzen thlay II Rah (With Crystal phoenix/ Plamo only) .
Moudashou Retsumaru (猛打将烈丸(もうだしょうれつまる)) - A form taken by Retsumaru when Saizo transformed into an armour.the form based ZGMF - X42A Destiny Gundam.

Seven of Light (光の七人衆)

Rekka-Musha Gundam (烈火武者頑駄無) - A famed hero of Ark who vanished during the last war.  At the start of Retsumaru's quest,  Rekka returned to life briefly in a borrowed body. He then appears whenever possible to aid his son and allies.

Rekka Gundam Dai-Shogun (烈火頑駄無大将軍) - When Retsumaru's own powers proves ineffective against Capiturn, Jimusuke gathers the others to lend their Bukabuka weapons in the form of a new set of armour which allows Retsumaru to combine their abilities with his own. Later, Rekka briefly wields this power as well.

Hurricane Swordsman Zeta (疾風剣豪 精太) - Trusted friend of Rekka and leader of a powerful force of horsemen. Zeta is always ready to use his skills to defend his country.
Dragon Monk Nu (龍神導師 仁宇) - Nu carries a glaive into battle but usually prefers to merge with his dragon spirit.
Hot-blooded Mechanic Double Zeta (剛熱機械師 駄舞留精太) - A budding inventor, he has produced a set of advanced armour for himself which includes a powerful cannon and also serves as inventor and mechanic for the Seven.
Covert Ninja Noomaru(隠密忍者 農丸) - A ninja warrior, Noomaru has seen the biggest change from his original design and now has a distinctive yin yang inspired black and white armour. He fights with a ninja star, each blade housing a different weapon. Noomaru wears an eyepatch over his right eye. The model kit implies this is just a bluff to fool enemies and that he has two healthy eyes. Rekka Musha Gundam's younger brother.
Soaring Hunter Mk II (天翔狩人 摩亜屈)- Seemingly the only warrior not to have fathered a son, Mk II hides a great secret...
Black Cavalryman (黒の騎兵) - A mysterious horse-mounted swordsman who provides aid to Retsumaru during his infiltration of Barzam Shogun's fortress.
AEUG (天翔狩人 衛有吾) - Black Cavalryman's true identity, younger sibling to Soaring Hunter Mk II and twin brother of Titan Mk II. He has taken it upon himself to bring his twin to justice.

Mecha Musha Psyco (鉄機武者 斎胡) - Having received great damage in the last war, Psyco is later revived as a mindless servant of Barzam Shogun. However, when the emotional bond between Saizo and Retsumaru broke Barzam's control, Psyco emerged from Psyco MK-II. After the war against Yami Jashin, Psyco's old data was used to resurrect the old musha.

Others

Kishiria (貴紫利亜) - Wife to Rekka and mother to Retsumaru, Kishiria has mostly raised her son by herself. However, she remains loyal to her husband and has raised her son to follow in his father's footsteps. With a tough attitude, she is perhaps the only person Retsumaru fears.
Mobile Musha Rekka Dai Hagane (機動武者 烈火大鋼) - A large mechanical Gundam left in a lake, Retsumaru is led to it to use in his battles against Musha Turn A's gigantic land battleships.
Ball (暴留(ボール)) Gundam army's infantry soldier.

Evil Musha army (邪悪武者軍団)

Capiturn Kyo (カピターン卿) - The initial main villain of the story, he draws power from evil spirits to launch his plans to conquer Ark. Initially portrayed as somewhat comical, he shows his true deadliness in a one-on-one battle against Retsumaru.
Gyakubatsu (抜刀武者 逆伐(ギャクバツ))/Musha X (武者鋭駆主(ムシャエックス)) - Capiturn's most trusted general, he is a descendant of demons.

In Hobby Japan version, Gyakubatsu is a descendant of Musha Gundam Mark-III (武者頑駄無真悪参).
Zirah (格闘士 勢羅) -
Jabaco (妖術使い 邪覇呼) - Killed by Rekka-Musha Gundam.
Bertigo (操術士 鈴程呼(べるてぃご)) - The only female general in the army. She can reanimate dead units. Revived unit has bell on its head.
Zans (斬首(ザンス)) - Jabaco's regular soldier.
Muzo (無象(ムゾー)) - Zirah's regular soldier. A cone-shaped robot half the height of regular SD unit, with 3 eyes in triangular formation. The name came from the term '有象無象', or mob.
Jenice (銭集(ゼニス)) - Bertigo's foot soldier wearing coned hat and wield spanner.
Dautap (導太夫(ドータップ)) - Bertigo's foot soldier.
Giros (魏呂須(ギロス)) - Zirah's henchman, and Retsumaru's first opponent.
Ebirhu (蝦流(エビル)) - Zirah's henchman, and Retsumaru's second opponent. Ranmaru followed Ebirhu until Retsumaru challenged Ebirhu second time.
Shy-Tarn (射威耽(シャイターン)) - Jabaco's henchman. Deputy captain of the investigation team. Its body is filled with eyeballs.  Shy-Tarn hid in the haunted house visited by Retsumaru, Jimusuke, Ranmaru. Shy-Tarn was killed by Retsumaru and Ranmaru.
Sandhoge (参胴珠(サンドージュ)) - Jabaco's henchman and captain of the investigation team, possessing a centipede-like body. It appear in the rubble after the death of Shy-Tarn. It was killed by Rekka-Musha Gundam.
Jenicus (銭数(ゼニカズ)) - Bertigo's henchman.
Septem (接点(セッテン)) - Bertigo's henchman.

Mecha Musha army (鉄機武者軍団)

Barzam Shogun (刃斬武将軍) - A powerful warlord who has experimented in creating artificial Musha Gundam soldiers. His armour hides a great secret...
Titan (逞鍛) - Barzam's Shogun true identity and younger sibling to Soaring Hunter Mk II. He reveals his true form upon encountering his other twin sibling, AEUG. According to Titan, the original Mark II (his elder brother) died long ago fighting another war. However, the people afterwards did not remember his sacrifice and continued to bicker and create unrest. Deeply distressed, Titan was touched by the darkness and came to the conclusion that emotions create unrest, and the perfect world is one ruled by emotionless machines. He infiltrated the Seven of Light under his brother's former title whilst working covertly under his Barzam disguise.

Psyco MK-II (鉄機武者 砕虎魔悪屈) - Once a member of the Seven of Light, Barzam Shogun took Psyco's damaged body and rebuilt it to be his most deadly robotic warrior. However, it requires Saizo to operate.
In the Comic World version of the story, Psyco MK-IIs are a mass production unit (量産型巨大鉄機・砕虎摩亜屈).

Marasai (魔羅斎) - The leader of the transport that carried Saizo.
The 3 Sharp Point Brothers (尖裏三兄弟(とんがりさんきょうだい)) - The 3 brothers Hambrabi (反斧羅尾), Himbrabi (貧斧羅尾), Humbrabi (粉斧羅尾) worked for Barzam to uncover ancient weapons, and specialized in using their sharp heads as weapons.  However, their schemes tend to backfire.  When Barzam revealed his plan to replace citizens in Ark with machines, the brothers changed sides to fight against the mass-produced machines.

Others

Yamijashin (闇邪神)- The force of evil given physical form by the creation of a copy Armour of Buka Buka by Barzam Shogun. He hopes to make this creation his most powerful minion but the powerful Yamijashin refuses. Realising the danger he has unleashed on Ark, Titan Mk II self-destructs in a failed attempt to destroy the monster. Without Retsumaru's sword, the Bukabuka armour is incomplete, and unable to keep the armour. Yamijashin was sealed away by Daishogun.
 Character based:gundam TR -6 Psycho inle

Model kits

Bandai released a full line of model kits based on the manga within the long running BB Senshi model kit line. In contrast to the earlier Musha Maruden series, a fair number of Gundams in the story did not receive model kits. In cases where such a character contributed to the Dai-Shogun armour, their contribution was given to another character. Specifically, a lack of kits for Kakuremaru and Susamaru saw their Bukabuka given to Double Zeta. Hobby Japan's SD Gundam World mook revealed that kits were designed for the two characters but not released. This small number of kits extends to the series releasing a single kit of the main character Retsumaru, in contrast to earlier series releasing multiple kits of the lead Gundam. At least one of his later forms was designed to at least be achievable using parts from the other kits. Also scrapped were more gimmicks for Kirimaru (including a pet dragon, a bird-like mask similar to Barzam Shogun's and a Base Jabber sled) and more armour for Retsumaru which seemed to imply he would grow up to be the First Gundam Dai-Shogun seen in Musha Senki.

This model kit series is also the second time a BB senshi Musha Gundam model series printed with Romanized names.  Previously, Romanized Musha Gundam names were used on models based on the first SD Sengokuden series, running from BB #23 (MUSHA Z GUNDAM) to BB #41 (SHŌ GUNDAM), and also a limited box set which included BB #113, #158, #232 .  Romanized names were included with BB models 265-278.

In 2009, a new series titled BB Senshi Sengokuden Bushin Kourin was announced. The series will reuse molds from this line with additional parts to make the Gundams resemble actual historical samurai such as Takeda Shingen. Most of the kits will also come with a Ball or Zako soldier. Coming at the same time as the similar Sangokuden Sidestory, the line is likely a response to the Late-2000s recession. Although designs for ZZ and Psyco were shown in initial announcements (in addition to GM soldiers, using the Sangokuden GM designs as a basis), no such kits have been released as of April 2010. The line instead opted to reuse two unrelated Dai-Shogun kits from previous BB Senshi Musha Gundam series.

BB #265- Retsumaru (Can be converted between normal mode and battle mode.)
BB #267- Rekka Musha Gundam (Removable armour, which can be placed on Retsumaru.)
BB #270- Ranmaru (Removable armour.)
BB #271- Musha Zeta (Removable armour, which can be placed on Ranmaru. Can combine with horse. Additionally, Ranmaru's chest armour can be placed on horse.)
BB #274- Kirimaru (Removable shoulder armour.)
BB #275- Musha Nu (Removable armour, some of which can be placed on Kirimaru. Can combine with dragon. Additionally, can wear Kirimaru's shoulder 'wings'.)
BB #277- Ikazuchimaru (Basic figure can be armoured up in various ways.)
BB #278- Musha Double Zeta (Removable armour. Armour can combine separately to make a tank. Additionally, can combine with Ikazuchimaru to make a larger armour vehicle.)
BB #279- Onmitsu (Removable armour. Large ninja star which can assume many forms, with each blade holding a different weapon. Additionally, can wear Rekka Musha Gundam's armour to disguise himself as him.)
BB #282- Musha Mk II (Removable armour. Can form an eagle like form. Contains parts to be built as either the good or evil Mk II.)
BB #283- Mobile Musha Rekka Dai Hagane (Large Musha-styled robot. Can be transformed between Mobile Musha and statue. Retsumaru or the included pilot can sit in the chest. Various weapons can be used by other kits in the series. Additionally, armour from other kits in the series can combine with it.)[Note: This kit is in fact a re-release of an earlier kit with some additional parts to give better proportions. The parts of both versions are intentionally included, with the instructions implying the unused characters/elements maybe connected to the unit's original use]
BB #284- Tekki Musha Psyco (Can be transformed into various forms. Can be built as good or evil Psyco.)
BB #286- Dai-Shogun Evolve Version (Can be built as new sculpt basic Rekka Musha Gundam or as golden armoured Dai-Shogun. Basic form can wear the armour from BB #267.)

See also
Musha Retsuden Official Site (Japanese)
Musharetsuden dictionary

Gundam Force Emaki
Shōnen manga